The kidney in animal anatomy is a part of the urinary system.

Kidney may also refer to:
Kidney (vertebrates), the kidney organ in vertebrate organisms
Kidney (Chinese medicine)
Kidney (food), the body part when used as food

Places
Kidney Island, Falkland Islands
Kidney Island (Western Australia) on List of islands of Western Australia, H–L
Kidney Island (Alaska) on List of islands of Alaska
Kidney Lake on List of lakes in Carbon County, Montana

People with the name
David Kidney (born 1955), British politician
Declan Kidney (born 1959), Irish rugby union coach
Brian Kidney, hurler for Cork Minor Hurling Team
Michael Kidney, hurler for Cork Hurling Team
R. Brian Kidney, Chief Clerk of the California State Assembly
Bob Kidney, see Tony Maimone

See also